John Henry Manley (July 21, 1907 – June 11, 1990) was an American physicist who worked with J. Robert Oppenheimer at the University of California, Berkeley before becoming a group leader during the Manhattan Project.

Biography 
He was born in 1907 in Harvard, Illinois. He graduated with a BS from the University of Illinois in 1929 and received his PhD in physics from the University of Michigan in 1934. He was a lecturer at Columbia University and later professor at the University of Illinois from 1937 to 1942. He married Kathleen (Kay), and had two daughters.

By the time World War II broke out, Manley was at the University of Chicago's Metallurgical Laboratory. In 1942, his friend and colleague, J. Robert Oppenheimer, held a meeting with several leading theorists at UC Berkeley. The topic of the meeting: develop preliminary plans to design and build a nuclear weapon. Manley, one of the attendees, was tasked with learning more about the properties of fast neutrons.

Less than a year later, the center of the project had shifted to the Los Alamos National Laboratory. Manley received a personal call from Leo Szilard to move from the Metallurgical Laboratory to Los Alamos and on April 4, 1943, Manley arrived at the laboratory. Manley spent his first days in Los Alamos working with other newcomers on the construction of laboratory buildings. He also installed a Cockcroft–Walton generator, which he had brought with him from Urbana. Throughout the war Manley served as one of Oppenheimer's principal aides, with particular responsibility for laboratory management. His wife Kay moved to Los Alamos in June 1943, following the birth of their second daughter. She was hired as a human computer in the T (Theoretical) Division but then quit after six months to focus on raising their children.

After the war, Manley left Los Alamos to serve as executive secretary of the general advisory committee for the Atomic Energy Commission, a federal agency charged with managing the nation's atomic assets. After leaving the AEC, he returned to Los Alamos as assistant director for research. In 1946, Manley served as associate professor of physics at Washington University in St. Louis for a semester. From 1951 to 1957, Manley taught physics at the University of Washington. He retired in 1974, and died in 1990 in Los Alamos at age 82.

See also 
 Lawrence Badash, J.O. Hirschfelder, H.P. Broida, eds., Reminiscences of Los Alamos 1943–1945 (Studies in the History of Modern Science), Springer, 1980, .

References

External links 
1965 Audio Interview with John Manley by Stephane Groueff Voices of the Manhattan Project
 New York Times obituary
 LANL biography

1907 births
1990 deaths
University of Illinois alumni
University of Michigan alumni
20th-century American physicists
American nuclear physicists
Manhattan Project people
University of Washington faculty
Washington University in St. Louis faculty
Washington University physicists
People from Harvard, Illinois